S. concinna may refer to:

 Schinia concinna, a North American moth
 Schismatoglottis concinna, a flowering plant
 Schizura concinna, a North American moth
 Scissurella concinna, a sea snail
 Sepsis concinna, an ant-mimicking fly
 Sigara concinna, a water boatman
 Siphonalia concinna, a sea snail
 Stenelmis concinna, a rifle beetle
 Stratiomys concinna, a soldier fly
 Swainsona concinna, a flowering plant
 Synaptocochlea concinna, a sea snail